Narcosius is a genus of butterflies in the family Hesperiidae (Eudaminae).

Species
Narcosius aulina (Evans, 1952) - French Guiana
Narcosius colossus (Herrich-Schäffer, 1869) - Mexico, Venezuela
Narcosius dosula (Evans, 1952) - Brazil
Narcosius granadensis (Möschler, 1879) - Venezuela, Peru, Brazil
Narcosius helen (Evans, 1952) - Mexico, Honduras
Narcosius hercules (Bell, 1956) - Bolivia, Brazil
Narcosius mura (Williams, 1927) - Brazil
Narcosius narcosius (Stoll, [1790]) - Suriname, Peru, Bolivia, Brazil
Narcosius nazaraeus Steinhauser, 1986 - Mexico
Narcosius odysseus Austin, 1996 - Brazil
Narcosius parisi (Williams, 1927) - Brazil
Narcosius pseudomura Austin, 1996 - Brazil
Narcosius samson (Evans, 1952) - Mexico, Colombia, Brazil
Narcosius steinhauseri Austin, 1996 - Brazil

References

Natural History Museum Lepidoptera genus database

Hesperiidae
Hesperiidae genera